Dunoon Castle is a ruined castle located at Dunoon on the Cowal peninsula in Argyll and Bute, Scotland. The castle sat upon a cone-shaped hill of about 80 feet high, a volcanic plug.  Very little remains of the castle's structure today. Castle House, built in 1822, stands a few yards north of the castle ruins.

The remains of the castle, and a surrounding area, are a scheduled monument.

The castle was a royal residence in the 14th century, and in the 17th century fell into ruins.

13th–15th century

The castle is first recorded in the thirteenth century. It may have been constructed in the context of the Stewarts increasing authority in Cowal.

In 1333 Dunoon Castle was besieged and taken by Edward Balliol, who surrendered it to Edward III of England. An insurrection ensued, driving Baliol out of Scotland. Robert the Steward, later King Robert II of Scotland, arrived in Cowal and, with the help of Colin Campbell of Lochow, retook the castle.

James III undertook to repay his Master of Household, Colin Campbell, 1st Earl of Argyll for repairs to the castle in 1468, and made him keeper of the castle in 1472. By the 15th century it was a royal castle with the Campbells as hereditary keepers.

16th century

In 1544 Dunoon Castle was besieged by Matthew Stewart, 4th Earl of Lennox.  Having eighteen ships and 800 soldiers provided by Henry VIII of England, Lennox succeeded in taking the Castles of Dunoon and Rothesay. Archibald Campbell, 4th Earl of Argyll, was driven out, sustaining great loss.

In 1563, Mary, Queen of Scots, stayed at the castle while visiting her half-sister, Jean Stewart, Countess of Argyll, and granted several charters during her visit. Mary's rebels met up at Dunoon during the Chaseabout Raid. Her brother the Earl of Moray's faction in Argyll included the Duke of Châtelherault, and the Earls of Argyll and Rothes. They left for Ayrshire on 18 August 1565.

17th century

In 1646 occurred the Dunoon massacre in which the Campbells slaughtered men, women, children, and infants of Clan Lamont. After the restoration of the episcopacy under Charles II, Dunoon became the residence of the bishops of Argyll for a time.
The castle was destroyed during the Earl of Argyll's rebellion against James VII and II in 1685.

20th century
During World War I and II, military fortifications were established at Dunoon Castle for the defense of the River Clyde and the shipbuilding industry.

References

External links

 Visit Scotland webpage for Dunoon Castle
 Gaelic place names of Scotland

Clan Campbell
Listed buildings in Dunoon
Ruined castles in Argyll and Bute
Scheduled Ancient Monuments in Argyll and Bute